Branden may refer to:

 Branden (given name)
 Branden (surname)

See also
Brandon (disambiguation)